Scipio Africanus was a Roman general who defeated his Carthaginian counterpart Hannibal.

The name may also  refer to:
Scipio Aemilianus (Scipio Africanus Aemilianus) (185-129 BC), adoptive grandson of the original Scipio Africanus
George Africanus (George John Scipio Africanus, 1763–1834), West African slave who became an entrepreneur in England.
Scipio Africanus (slave) (1702–1720), West African British slave.
Scipio Africanus Jones (1863–1943), African American educator, jurist, and politician.

Ship 
Italian cruiser Scipione Africano, an Italian warship of World War II

See also
 
 Publius Cornelius Scipio (disambiguation)